Sebastián Ayala (born 14 September 1995) is a Colombian professional footballer who plays for Deportes Quindío.

References

1995 births
Living people
Colombian footballers
Colombia under-20 international footballers
Colombian expatriate footballers
Categoría Primera A players
Primeira Liga players
La Equidad footballers
C.D. Nacional players
Millonarios F.C. players
Jaguares de Córdoba footballers
Expatriate footballers in Portugal
Association football midfielders
Sportspeople from Santander Department
Deportes Quindío footballers